Heterosaccus is a genus of barnacles in infraclass Rhizocephala. Like other taxa in this group, they parasitize crabs. Geoffroy Smith circumscribed the genus in 1906; he initially only included H. hians. Smith circumscribed a genus distinct from Sacculina due to a difference of the mesentery; in Heterosaccus, the mesentery does not stretch down to the mantle opening but rather only is present on the ring of attachment.

Species

, WoRMS recognizes the following fifteen species.

References

Further reading

 
 

Barnacles
Parasitic crustaceans
Parasites of crustaceans
Crustacean genera